Harry Whittier Frees (1879–1953) was an American photographer who created novelty postcards, magazine spreads, and children's books based on his photographs of posed animals.

Early life

Frees was born in Reading, Pennsylvania, in 1879, after which his family moved to Oaks, Pennsylvania.

Work 
He dressed the animals and posed them in human situations with props, often with captions; these can be seen as progenitors of modern lolcats.

On the choice of cats for his photos Frees states in his book Animal Land on the Air: 

 

He used 1/5th of a second exposures and held the animals in position using stiff costuming, pins, and forks. He worked three months out of the year, since making the images was stressful.

Frees is thought to have shot the uncredited photographic illustrations for children’s author Eulalie Osgood Grover’s 1911 educational children's book, Kittens and Cats: A First Reader.

In 1937 he was working in Audubon, assisted by a housekeeper who made the animal costumes.

Personal life 
He remained single and spent much of his life caring for his parents; after they died he moved to Clearwater, Florida.

Death 
Frees committed suicide in 1953 after being diagnosed with cancer.

References

Further reading
 Cats, Dogs & Other Rabbits: The Extraordinary World of Harry Whittier Frees by Harry Whittier Frees and Sylvie Treille, Dewi Lewis Publishing, 2006.
 בר, ראם: "חיות בלבוש אדם ומסורות חזותיות בשירי אמא אווזה של הארי ויטייר פריס", עיונים בספרות ילדים 20 (תשע″א, 2011) עמ′ 55-16. This Hebrew article focuses on Frees′ photographs for "The Animal Mother Goose" and presents their design techniques, from straightforward mimicry of previous illustrations, through adherence to traditional iconography, to a parody on popular American visual motives not otherwise related to the rhymes. It includes a review of anthropomorphic animals in art, their photographic versions and their becoming a feature of children's literature.

External links

 

American illustrators
People from Reading, Pennsylvania
American photographers
1879 births
1953 deaths
Artists from Pennsylvania
1953 suicides